Vladislav Sergeyevich Polyashov (alt. spelling: Poliashov; ; born 4 April 1995) is a Russian artistic gymnast. He is a 2018 world silver medalist in the team competition (as an alternate on the Russian team).

Biography 
At the 2017 Summer Universiade, Poliashov won a team bronze and a horizontal bar silver.

At the 2018 World Artistic Gymnastics Championships in Doha, Qatar, he was the alternate on the Russian team and was awarded a silver medal for the team competition.

Competitive history

References

External links 
 

1995 births
Living people
Russian male artistic gymnasts
Universiade medalists in gymnastics
Universiade silver medalists for Russia
Universiade bronze medalists for Russia
Gymnasts at the 2019 European Games
European Games medalists in gymnastics
European Games bronze medalists for Russia
Gymnasts at the 2020 Summer Olympics
Olympic gymnasts of Russia
21st-century Russian people